Isalo National Park is a National Park in the Ihorombe Region of Madagascar, in the southwestern corner of the Province of Fianarantsoa. The closest town is Ranohira, and the closest cities are Toliara and Ihosy. There are permanent rivers and streams as well as many seasonal watercourses.

History and significance
Isalo National Park was created in 1962 and has been administered by the Madagascar National Parks authority since 1997. The Bara people have traditionally inhabited this area, a nomadic people subsisting on cattle (zebu) farming. There are burial sites of the Bara people and some older burial sites of the Sakalava.

Isalo is primarily within the dry deciduous forests ecoregion, an ecoregion in which natural vegetation has been reduced by almost 40% of its original extent. It also includes landscapes considered part of the subhumid forests ecoregion, an ecoregion that is home to numerous endemic species and has been given Critical/Endangered status because only small areas of native habitat remain and most of those are highly fragmented. The woodlands of Isalo are dominated by the endemic tree tapia (Uapaca bojeri). This is a woodland type that is restricted in distribution; found only in Madagascar's central highlands. Some of the largest intact areas of tapia woodlands are found in Isalo. There are numerous narrowly endemic plant species found here, including 13 species that have been found only in Isalo and another 35 that are rare species, known from 2-5 sites. Not only is Sarcolaenaceae a plant family found only in Madagascar, two species within it (Sarcolaena isaloensis and Schizolaena isaloensis) have only been found in Isalo NP. There are also unusual lichens here, including the type specimen and only known location for the narrowly endemic Isalonactis madagascariensis.

Climate
Isalo National Park is in the arid western part of Madagascar, within the western dry deciduous forest bioclimatic zone. The area has a hot, dry climate with two seasons; a cooler-drier season and a warmer-wetter season. Each lasts from 5–7 months. Precipitation is lowest in June, averaging . December thru February are typically the wettest months.

Geology
Located in the southern part of the Morondava Basin, the sedimentary Isalo Group is the main geological formation of the park, forming the Isalo Massif. The group is up to 6,000m thick, of Triassic to early Jurassic origin and made up of coarse-grained sandstone deposited by braided streams. The Isalo Massif has been eroded by wind and water, resulting in deep canyons, sandstone domes, flat-topped mountains and "runiform" mountains - steep sided outcrops that have been dissected into odd-shapes. These odd shapes are referred to as "runiforme", based on the French word for "carved".

Tourism
A local guide is required for visitors entering the park, and guides and porters can be hired in Ranohira. Treks in the park can last from several hours to a week or longer. The park includes several natural swimming pools which are popular among tourists, and are excellent sites to see the Benson's Rock Thrush. The main threat to this park comes from illegal wildfires set in the park.  The wildfires limit the extent of forest and maximize grasslands used by cattle.

Fauna
Fourteen species of mammals are reported for Isalo NP, including several different species of lemur.

Over 100 species of bird have been found here, including Benson's rock thrush (Monticola sharpei bensoni), the knob-billed duck (Sarkidiornis melanotos) and the Madagascar ibis (Lophotibis cristata).

Twenty four amphibians and 47 reptiles have been documented in Isalo National Park, including a number of new “candidate” species. Species endemic to the Isalo area include four amphibians (Gephyromantis azzurrae, Mantella expectata, Mantidactylus noralottae, and the Malagasy rainbow frog (Scaphiophryne gottlebei) and one reptile species (Trachylepis nancycoutuae). Notable examples include the Madagascar ground boa (Acrantophis madagascariensis), Dumeril's boa (Acrantophis dumerili) and the white-lipped bright-eyed frog (Boophis albilabris).

Flora
Botanical inventory of the Isalo region began with collections by Perrier de la Bâthie in 1910. Only 10 of the over 400 species that have been documented in Isalo are non-native species. Most (over 70%) are vascular plants that are endemic to Madagascar. There are 13 species that have been found only in Isalo and another 35 are rare species, known from 2-5 sites. The following table lists the species known only from Isalo NP.

Some entire families of plants are endemic to Madagascar. Examples of three of these families can be found in Isalo; Asteropeiaceae, Sarcolaenaceae and Sphaerosepalaceae. Not only is Sarcolaenaceae a plant family found only in Madagascar, two species within it (Sarcolaena isaloensis and Schizolaena isaloensis) have only been found in Isalo NP.

Lichens

The lichens of Madagascar are poorly known, but over 500 species have been documented. Only about 20 species are found in the dry areas of the country. Several of these have been documented in the Isalo area, including the type specimen and only known location for the narrowly endemic Isalonactis madagascariensis.

Vegetation
Isalo is primarily within the dry deciduous forests ecoregion, an ecoregion in which natural vegetation has been reduced by almost 40% of its original extent. It also includes isolated forest patches classified as part of the subhumid forests ecoregion, an ecoregion that is home to numerous endemic species and has been given Critical/Endangered status because only small areas of native habitat remain and most of those are highly fragmented. Six main habitats have been described in Isalo NP.

1. Sclerophylous woodlands
The sclerophyllous (hard-leafed, drought adapted) woodlands of Isalo are dominated by the endemic tree tapia (Uapaca bojeri). This is a woodland type that is restricted in distribution; found only in Madagascar's central highlands. Some of the largest intact areas of tapia woodlands are found in Isalo. These woodlands are adapted to regular burning and are characterized by a relatively open canopy dominated primarily by tapia, but other trees may include members of the family Euphorbiaceae or the endemic family Sarcolaenaceae. The main components of the shrub layer are made up of species from the families Asteraceae, Rubiaceae, and Leguminosae, but herbs and grasses form the main understory. Endemic Kalanchoe and Aloe species grow in this habitat.

2. Evergreen humid forest
These forests are associated with moist habitats such as near streams or in the deep ravines. Native forests found in deep canyons have palm species (Ravenea and Dypsis species), Breonadia salicina, Weinmannia sp., Voacanga sp. and Dracaena sp. Some of these moist habitats however are now dominated by introduced species such as Melia azedarach, Mangifera indica or Eugenia sp.

3. Pandanus thickets
Pandanus thickets, dominated by Pandanus pulcher occur associated with shallower valleys or small stream are where the forest is degraded and frequently burned.

4. Dry (xerophytic) vegetation
This habitat is associated with dry rocky areas, including steep slopes and ridges. Although vegetation is sparse, a number of endemic species are found in these habitats, including Xerophyta sp., elephant's foot (Pachypodium rosulatum var. gracilius) and the narrow endemic Aloe isaloensis.

5. Secondary shrub communities
Secondary shrub communities are found where the slopes of the Isalo Massif contact fields or pastures. The most common species in these communities are listed as: Mimosa latispinosa, Vangueria madagascariensis, Maesa lanceolata, Aphloia theaeformis, Crotalaria sp., and Tamarindus indica.

6. Grasslands
Native grasslands, probably once restricted to small patches, are thought to have expanded as a result of intensive burning, primarily to facilitate cattle grazing. Grasslands (also called pseudo-steppes) are now widespread in Isalo, dominated by Aristida similis and Aristida rufescens as well as Trachypogon sp. or Heteropogon sp. Frequent burning maintains the grasslands and prevents tree regrowth.

Gallery

See also
 List of national parks of Madagascar

References

External links

 Official website (in French)
 Wild Madagascar- Isalo

National parks of Madagascar
Ihorombe
Protected areas established in 1999
1999 establishments in Madagascar
Madagascar dry deciduous forests
Madagascar subhumid forests
Important Bird Areas of Madagascar